Carcer City were a metalcore band from Liverpool, UK. In total, they released 3 EPs and 3 full-length albums. They toured both nationally and internationally with well-known artists such as While She Sleeps, Hacktivist, Loathe, Still Remains, Attila, the Word Alive, and more.

Formed in 2007, they played their final headline show on 14 April 2019 at The Black Heart in Camden, London. They made their final appearance at Techfest festival 2019.

The band got its name from the fictional video game setting of the same name, featured in the Manhunt and Grand Theft Auto games.

History

Formation, first EP and The Life We Have Chosen (2008 - 2012) 
The band met in college during 2007. They released their first EP In The Wake Of Ruin shortly after.
 
In 2009, the band released another EP called Affliction.
The band's first music video was released for the song I Hope You're Left With Nothing.

After the success of these two EP's, the band released their first full-length album The Life We Have Chosen in November 2009 after being signed to Transcend Music.

The Road Journals and The Process (2012 - 2016)
The band released their second full-length album titled The Road Journals as a free download in 2012. To download the album for free, you had to tweet about it to get access to the download.
A small number were also made physically. This album was written while on tour from the previous album The Life We Have Chosen'.

In 2013, they released a single called The Process as a free download with accompanying music video.

in 2013, while touring in Austria, they were left stranded when they were involved in a bus crash. Nobody was hurt and they managed to return home.

 Infinite//Unknown and Signing to Staysick Recordings (2016 - 2018)

On 7 May 2016 the band signed to Staysick Recordings, a notable independent American record label for metal based in Sacramento, California, United States. The record label is owned by Chris Fronzak, vocalist of Attila. Other bands on this label include Capture, Bury Tomorrow, Chelsea Grin and Crystal Lake. They announced a new album called Infinite//Unknown and released a music video of the same name.
The construction of this album, from chord progression to track placement was partly done based on the vocalist's unique condition called Synesthesia which causes him to write and arrange music in colours.
Aaron Matts from Betraying The Martyrs features on the track 'Perceptions'.
The album was met with positive reviews from critics.

 Silent War EP and Farewell Tour (2018 - 2019)

On 8 February 2019 the band announced their farewell tour across the UK with support from Last Hounds and final EP titled Silent War. This EP was going to be their last EP as a band, stating that the band was no longer sustainable. Silent War was self-released by the band, with a video made for the track Replicant''

Musical style and influences 

Carcer City's music style has often been described as progressive metalcore with atmospheric and electronic elements. The band create their own album artwork for each release.

Discography 

Studio Albums

Extended Plays

Music videos/Singles

References 

English metalcore musical groups
Musical groups from Liverpool
2008 establishments in England